Pulo Island, commonly known as Isla Pulo, is a long, narrow island surrounded by mudflats in the Manila Bay coast of Navotas, about  north of Manila in the Philippines. It is a sitio in Barangay Tanza, connected to the mainland of Navotas by a  bamboo bridge. The island is known for its mangroves for which it was declared a "marine tree park" and as one of four ecotourism sites in Metro Manila established under the National Ecotourism Strategy in 1999. In 2014, it was home to a resettlement site of about 137 indigent families that mostly occupied the island's southern tip.

The island's name is tautological toponym, for "pulo" already means "island" in the Filipino language.

Description
Isla Pulo runs along the coast of Manila Bay from the mouth of the Tangos River in Navotas to the village of Salambao at the city's border with Obando, Bulacan near the mouth of the Meycauayan River. It is joined at low tide to the mainland of Navotas by intertidal mudflats.

The island is known to host the remaining old growth mangrove forest found in Metro Manila. Its mangroves and surrounding mudflats provide sanctuary for 11 species of migratory birds, including the Chinese egret, tern, kingfisher, gull and plover. The most common type of mangrove found on the island is the Avicennia rumphiana (bungalon). It is also inhabited by 3 species of crabs and 14 species of shellfish.

Until the 1980s, Isla Pulo contained long stretches of white sand beaches and thick mangrove vegetation. Its ecology changed with the arrival of informal settlers in the 1990s. The island had become heavily polluted, with trash from a nearby dumpsite washing up on its shores. Several mangrove trees were cut down for charcoal and many of the island's fauna were hunted for food. A campaign was launched in 2014 to declare the island a critical habitat and eco-tourism area in order to protect the remaining mangroves and restore the island's ecosystem.

All informal settlers on the island were relocated in 2016. A waterbird census conducted in January 2017 reported a sharp increase in the number of bird sightings in the island to 11,782 from 5,302 the previous year, which was attributed to the decline of disturbance following the relocation.

See also
 Freedom Island
 List of islands in the Greater Manila Area

References

Islands of Metro Manila
Islands of Manila Bay
Navotas
Sitios and puroks of the Philippines